Soloco is one of twenty-one districts of Chachapoyas Province, in Peru.

Geography
Soloco is located in the high mountains. 
In the north the District of Soloco has border with the District of San an Francisco de Daguas (Chachapoyas) and the District of Molinopampa (Chachapoyas), in the East with the District of Cheto (Chachapoyas), in the south with the District of Cochamal (Chachapoyas) and the District of San Isidro of Maino (Chachapoyas), in the west with the District of Chachapoyas and the District of Levanto (Chachapoyas).

Attractions

Soloco offers several attractive places, such as the beautiful Ruins of Soloco, a fortress of extraordinary size.

The management holiday of the capital Soloco is celebrated on September 28. Another very big holiday for the people is the holiday of the Master of the Miracles, on October 18.

Typical meals are known by the Parboiled one, the Purtumute, Locro de Chochoca and the cuy with dads between others. Soloco belongs to the parroquía of Chachapoyas that is attended by two Priests of the Diocese of Chachapoyas.

1861 establishments in Peru
Districts of the Chachapoyas Province
Districts of the Amazonas Region